Frederick Forney Foscue (September 11, 1819 – March 3, 1906) was an American politician who served in the Texas House of Representatives from 1859 to 1866 and the Texas Senate from 1866 to 1870.

Life
Foscue was born on September 11, 1819, to Benjamin Foscue and an unknown mother. He was one of 9 children. Later, he married Mary J. Foscue and had 2 children. He died on March 3, 1906, and was buried at Arlington, Tarrant, Texas.

Politics
Foscue was first elected as the representative of the 21st district of the Texas House of Representatives from November 1859 to November 1861. There was more than one representative during the legislature before and after Foscue's term. Foscue was then elected as the representative of the Texas House of Representatives for District 1 from November 1863 to August 1866. His final term was for the 1st district of the Texas Senate from August 1866 to February 1870.

References

1819 births
1906 deaths
Members of the Texas House of Representatives
19th-century American politicians